Ocean Parkway Jewish Center is a historic synagogue at 550 Ocean Pkwy. in Kensington, Brooklyn, New York, New York.  It was built between 1924 and 1926 and is a three-story plus basement and attic, stone clad Neoclassical style building.  It has a two-story addition.  The front facade features three round-arched entrances and the second and third stories are organized as a temple front.

It was listed on the National Register of Historic Places in 2009.
Chairman and Director: Allen Michaels

The synagogue was established following the 1924 merger of its predecessors, Congregation of Kensington, founded 1907, and the West Flatbush Jewish Center. The two synagogues, located about two blocks apart from each other (Ditmas and Dahill Roads, and East 2nd Street near Ditmas, respectively) had outgrown their spaces, and purchased seven lots on Ocean Parkway immediately within one month of joining forces. The building was completed in 1926, at a total cost of around $450,000. At the time, it was named, The Ocean Parkway Jewish Center of the First Congregation of Kensington Tiphereth Israel.

The Ocean Parkway Jewish Center was previously affiliated with Conservative Judaism under Rav Yakov Bosniak's leadership for nearly 30 years. His sermons during the 1940s informed congregants about the catastrophe of the Holocaust in Europe (ref: Interpreting Jewish Life: The Sermons and Addresses of Jacob Bosniak). The synagogue is presently Orthodox.

References

External links

The New York Landmarks Conservancy: Conservancy Guides Historic Brooklyn Synagogues Towards State, National Register Listing
Ocean Parkway Jewish Center Home Page

Synagogues completed in 1926
Properties of religious function on the National Register of Historic Places in Brooklyn
Synagogues in Brooklyn
Synagogues on the National Register of Historic Places in New York City
1924 establishments in New York City
Neoclassical synagogues
Orthodox synagogues in New York City